Enemies In-Law (lit. "Dangerous Meeting of In-Laws 2" or "Clash of the Families 2") is a 2015 South Korean film directed by Kim Jin-young, starring Jin Se-yeon and Hong Jong-hyun.

It is a spin-off (or thematic sequel) to Meet the In-Laws (2011).

Plot
Park Young-hee is a former national fencing athlete and currently a detective in the narcotics department. She also comes from a family of cops, from her soon-to-retire father to her siblings and their spouses. Han Chul-soo is the only son of two notorious criminals; his father steals cultural objects while his mother specializes in document forgery.

Chul-soo and Young-hee fall in love, but when the couple declares their intention to get married, both families disapprove. To placate Young-hee's father, Chul-soo promises that he will pass the police officer exam and become a detective like her. He spends the next seven years studying and preparing for the exam, with Young-hee by his side as supportive girlfriend.

As the exam date nears, Chul-soo's parents resort to desperate measures to sabotage the wedding and his future in the police force. Meanwhile, Young-hee and her family are ordered to investigate a serial murder case, and using his parents' expertise, Chul-soo helps with the case.

Cast
 Jin Se-yeon as Park Young-hee
 Hong Jong-hyun as Han Chul-soo
 Shin Jung-geun as Han Dal-sik
 Jeon Soo-kyung as Jo Kang-ja
 Kim Eung-soo as Park Man-choon
 Park Doo-shik as Min-goo	
 Park Eun-hye as Park Young-mi
 Kim Do-yeon as Park Young-sook
 Kim Sun-young as Teacher
 Jung Sung-hwa as Man using the urinal
 Kim Soo-mi as Granny selling rice cakes
 Lee Jun-hyeok as Delivery man

Release
Enemies In-Law was released in theaters on April 29, 2015, and opened in third place at the box office. The film earned  from 210,000 admissions in its first five days.

References

External links 
  
 Enemies In-Law at Lotte Entertainment
 
 
 

2015 films
2010s Korean-language films
South Korean romantic comedy films
Lotte Entertainment films
2010s South Korean films